Kathleen 'Kathy' R Rowlatt (born 14 May 1948) is a British former diver.

Diving career
She competed in the 1968 Summer Olympics.

She represented England and won a gold medal in the 3 metres springboard, at the 1966 British Empire and Commonwealth Games in Kingston, Jamaica.

References

1948 births
Living people
British female divers
Olympic divers of Great Britain
Divers at the 1968 Summer Olympics
Divers at the 1966 British Empire and Commonwealth Games
Commonwealth Games medallists in diving
Commonwealth Games gold medallists for England
Medallists at the 1966 British Empire and Commonwealth Games